Samuel Becket Boyd II (March 20, 1865March 29, 1929) was the fire chief of Knoxville, Tennessee who died in the line of duty. He was president of the International Association of Fire Chiefs in 1924.

Biography
He was born on March 20, 1865 in Abingdon, Virginia to Samuel Becket Boyd I (18281890) and Isabella Reed (18311907). He had a sister, Isabella Kennedy Boyd (18601936) who married John Mebane Allen. He married Julia Harrison. He joined the fire department in 1900. He was president of the International Association of Fire Chiefs in 1924.

He died on March 29, 1929 of a heart attack in Knoxville, Tennessee after a fire while en route to the hospital. He was buried in the Old Gray Cemetery in Knoxville, Tennessee.

References

External links
Samuel Becket Boyd at the Tennessee Fallen Firefighters Memorial

American fire chiefs
People from Knoxville, Tennessee
1865 births
1929 deaths
International Association of Fire Chiefs